Mount Bowles is an ice-covered mountain  high, the summit of Bowles Ridge in the central part of eastern Livingston Island in the South Shetland Islands, Antarctica. It is situated south of Vidin Heights and north of Mount Friesland, Tangra Mountains to which it is linked by Wörner Gap.

The origin of the name is uncertain; it appears (poorly positioned and probably intended for some other peak on the island) on the 1829 chart of the British expedition (1828–31) under Captain Henry Foster in HMS .

Mount Bowles was first climbed by Àlex Simón, Vicente Castro, David Hita and a friend from Juan Carlos I Station on January 5, 2003.

Location

Maps
 S. Soccol, D. Gildea and J. Bath. Livingston Island, Antarctica. Scale 1:100000 satellite map. The Omega Foundation, USA, 2004.
 L.L. Ivanov et al., Antarctica: Livingston Island and Greenwich Island, South Shetland Islands (from English Strait to Morton Strait, with illustrations and ice-cover distribution), 1:100000 scale topographic map, Antarctic Place-names Commission of Bulgaria, Sofia, 2005
 L.L. Ivanov. Antarctica: Livingston Island and Greenwich, Robert, Snow and Smith Islands. Scale 1:120000 topographic map.  Troyan: Manfred Wörner Foundation, 2009.

References

 D. Gildea. Mountaineering in Antarctica: complete guide: Travel guide. Primento and Editions Nevicata, 2015. 

Mountains of Livingston Island